The River Salwarpe is a  long river in Worcestershire, England. It is a left bank tributary of the River Severn, which it joins near Hawford.

Course
The Salwarpe is formed by the confluence of the Battlefield and  Spadesbourne Brooks in Bromsgrove, it then passes Stoke Prior, Upton Warren, Wychbold, Droitwich. Downstream of Droitwich, it passes Salwarpe, and then meets the River Severn, near Hawford.

Andrew Yarranton attempted unsuccessfully to make it navigable in the 1660s, but in the 21st century a stretch of the river in Droitwich was canalized to link the Barge and Junction sections of the Droitwich Canal.
 
Tributaries include the Elmbridge, Hadley and Hen brooks.

Hydrology
The flow of the Salwarpe has been measured in its lower reaches at Harford Hill since 1958.

Land use is primarily agricultural arable and grassland.

Water quality
The Environment Agency measure water quality of the river systems in England. Each is given an overall ecological status, which may be one of five levels: high, good, moderate, poor and bad. There are several components that are used to determine this, including biological status, which looks at the quantity and varieties of invertebrates, angiosperms and fish. Chemical status, which compares the concentrations of various chemicals against known safe concentrations, is rated good or fail.

The water quality of the Salwarpe and its tributaries was as follows in 2016.

The water quality of all the riverine waterbodies in the lower catchment have regressed from moderate in 2009 to poor in 2016. The two upper tributaries remained at moderate. Chemical quality is good in the Salwarpe and its four monitored tributaries.

See also
 List of rivers in England

References

Salwarpe
Droitwich Spa
Salwarpe
1Salwarpe